Group 7 consisted of five of the 50 teams entered into the European zone: Belgium, Netherlands, San Marino, Turkey, and Wales. These five teams competed on a home-and-away basis for two of the 15 spots in the final tournament allocated to the European zone, with the group's winner and runner-up claiming those spots.

Standings

Results

Goal scorers

8 goals
 Hakan Şükür

7 goals
 Dennis Bergkamp

5 goals

 Luís Oliveira
 Lorenzo Staelens
 Oktay Derelioğlu
 Dean Saunders

4 goals

 Frank de Boer
 Pierre van Hooijdonk
 Mark Hughes

3 goals
 Andy Melville

2 goals

 Émile Mpenza
 Luc Nilis
 Eric Van Meir
 Ronald de Boer
 Wim Jonk
 Patrick Kluivert
 Arif Erdem
 Ryan Giggs
 Mark Pembridge

1 goal

 Gert Claessens
 Bertrand Crasson
 Marc Degryse
 Gert Verheyen
 Marc Wilmots
 John Bosman
 Phillip Cocu
 Clarence Seedorf
 Jaap Stam
 Aron Winter
 Saffet Ayküz
 Oğuz Çetin
 Hami Mandirali
 Ertuğrul Sağlam
 Sergen Yalçın
 Nathan Blake
 John Robinson
 Robbie Savage
 Gary Speed

own goals
 Luca Gobbi (for )

Notes

External links 
Group 7 Detailed Results at RSSSF

7
1996–97 in Belgian football
Qual
1996–97 in Dutch football
Qual
1996–97 in San Marino football
1997–98 in San Marino football
1996–97 in Turkish football
1997–98 in Turkish football
1996–97 in Welsh football
1997–98 in Welsh football
1995–96 in San Marino football
1995–96 in Welsh football